Modest Ilyich Tchaikovsky (–) was a Russian dramatist, opera librettist and translator.

Early life
Modest Ilyich was born in Alapayevsk, Verkhotursky Uyezd, Perm Governorate, the younger brother of the composer Pyotr Ilyich Tchaikovsky. He graduated from the Imperial School of Jurisprudence with a degree in law. In 1876, Modest became the tutor to a deaf-mute boy Nikolai ("Kolya") Hermanovich Konradi (1868–1922) and, using a special teaching method, helped him to talk, write, and read. In his still unpublished Autobiography, broadly quoted by Alexander Poznansky, Modest Ilyich Tchaikovsky mentions his and his brother Pyotr Ilyich Tchaikovsky's homosexuality.

Career
Modest chose to dedicate his entire life to literature and music. He wrote plays, translated sonnets by Shakespeare into Russian and wrote librettos for operas by his brother Pyotr, as well as for other composers such as Eduard Nápravník, Arseny Koreshchenko, Anton Arensky and Sergei Rachmaninoff. Being the nearest friend of his brother, he became his first biographer, and also the founder of the Tchaikovsky Museum in Klin.

Plays
 Predrassudki  (Предрассудки –  Prejudices)
 Simfoniya (Симфония – Symphony)
 Den' v Peterburge (День в Петербурге – A Day in St Petersburg)

Opera libretti
 Pyotr Ilyich Tchaikovsky: The Queen of Spades (Пиковая дама - Pikovaya dama), Op. 68, 1890.  Premiered: , St Petersburg
 Tchaikovsky: Iolanta (Иоланта – Iolanta), Op. 69, 1891, based on the Danish play Kong Renés Datter (King René’s Daughter) by Henrik Hertz, translated by Fyodor Miller and adapted by Vladimir Rafailovich Zotov.  Premiered: 1892, Mariinsky Theatre, St Petersburg.
 Eduard Nápravník: Dubrovsky (Дубровский).  Premiered: , at the Mariinsky Theatre, St Petersburg.
 Arseny Koreshchenko: Ledyanoy dom (Ледяной дом).  Premiered: , Moscow.
 Anton Arensky: Nal' i Damayanty (Наль и Дамаянти), after the epos Mahabharata.  Premiered:  , Moscow.
Sergei Rachmaninoff: Francesca da Rimini (Франческа да Римини), Op. 25, 1904, after the story of the heroine Francesca da Rimini from the fifth canto of Dante's epic poem The Inferno (the first part of The Divine Comedy).  Premiered: , Bolshoi Theatre, Moscow.

References

Bibliography
Tchaikovsky, Modest:  The Life And Letters of Peter Ilich Tchaikovsky, University Press of the Pacific (2004)

External links
 
 

1850 births
1916 deaths
People from Alapayevsk
People from Verkhotursky Uyezd
Russian male dramatists and playwrights
Russian opera librettists
Russian people of French descent
Imperial School of Jurisprudence alumni
Russian gay writers
Russian LGBT dramatists and playwrights
Pyotr Ilyich Tchaikovsky
Russian twins
Gay dramatists and playwrights
19th-century writers from the Russian Empire
19th-century dramatists and playwrights from the Russian Empire
20th-century Russian dramatists and playwrights